Eugene Lipinski (born 5 November 1956) is a British-Canadian character actor and screenwriter. He was born in Wansford Camp, Soke of Peterborough, England, and raised in Regina, Saskatchewan, Canada. He began acting at the age of twelve in amateur theatre. After graduating from the University of Regina, he returned to the UK and attended the Royal Academy of Arts as well as the Drama Studio London.

He is well-known for his appearances in TV series such as Animorphs as Visser Three, Fringe as December, as Abe Slaney in The Adventures of Sherlock Holmes episode The Dancing Men and Da Vinci's City Hall and Da Vinci's Inquest as Lloyd Manning.

As a screenwriter, in 1991, he won the Genie Award for Best Screenplay for the film Perfectly Normal.

Filmography 

Film:
 Hanover Street (1979) - 1st German Clerk
 Yanks (1979) - Irish Barman
 Bad Timing (1980) - Hospital Policeman
 Superman II (1980) - Newsvendor
 Outland (1981) - Cane
 Shock Treatment (1981) - Kirk
 Moonlighting (1982) - Banaszak
 Firefox (1982) - KGB Agent #1
 Sophie's Choice (1982) - Polish Professor
 Octopussy (1983) - Head VOPO (uncredited)
 Gulag (1985) - Yuri
 The American Way (1986) - Ace
 Superman IV: The Quest for Peace (1987) - Cosmonaut Space Walker
 Leviathan (1989) - Russian Ship Captain 
 Indiana Jones and the Last Crusade (1989) - G-Man
 Perfectly Normal (1991, also screenplay) - Hopeless
 Boozecan (1994) - Braston
 Strange and Rich (1994)
 Never Talk to Strangers (1995) - Dudakoff
 Harriet the Spy (1996) - George Waldenstein
 Affliction (1997) - Atty. J. Battle Hand
 Conquest (1998) - Glenn Boychuk
 Water Damage (1999) - David King
 Bless the Child (2000) - Stuart
 Borderline Normal (2001) - Mr. Dickens
 Solitude (2001) - Father Gregory
 Century Hotel (2001) - George
 Who Is Cletis Tout? (2001) - Falco
 Maximum Capacity (2001) - Eli
 Rollerball (2002) - Yuri Kotlev
 The Recruit (2003) - Husky Man
 Irish Eyes (2004) - Angelo Zagliardi
 The Lost Angel (2005) - Detective Zilinski
 Bailey's Billion$ (2005) - Leo
 Year of the Carnivore (2009) - Lloyd Zaslavsky
 Fringe (2009-2013) - December
 Monbella and the Curse of 1809 (2009) - Alexader Anderson
 The Art of the Steal (2013) - Bartkowiak
 Warcraft (2016) - Finden
 The Unseen (2016) - Milton
 Siberia - Polozin
 The Informer - Klimek

Television:
 Tinker Tailor Soldier Spy (1979, TV miniseries) - Czech Guard
 Screen Two (1987-91) - Juliusz Janowski / Maj. Bannerman
 Love and Hate: The Story of Colin and JoAnn Thatcher (1989) - Garry Anderson
 The Diary of Evelyn Lau (1994, TV movie) - Joe
 Highlander: The Series (1995) - Brother Paul
 Goosebumps (1995-97) - Rocky (voice) / Mr. Mortman
 Animorphs (1998-99) - Visser Three / Victor Trent
 A Glimpse of Hell (2001, TV movie) - Skelley
 Da Vinci's City Hall (2005-06) - Lloyd Manning
 Canada Russia '72 (2006, TV movie) - Anatoly Tarasov
 Intelligence (2006-07) - Martin Kiniski
 The Quality of Life (2008, TV movie)
 Alice (2008, miniseries) - Lloyd Manning
 The Kennedys (2011, miniseries) - Nikita Khrushchev 
 Arrow (2012-13) - Alexei Leonov
 The Romeo Section (2015-16, TV series) - Al Crenshaw

References

External links 
 
 Eugene Lipinski - Fringepedia FRINGE Wiki
 Eugene Lipinski - Da Vinci Online

1956 births
Living people
English male film actors
English male television actors
English screenwriters
English male screenwriters
Best Screenplay Genie and Canadian Screen Award winners
Male actors from Cambridgeshire
Male actors from Regina, Saskatchewan
People from Wansford, Cambridgeshire
Canadian male film actors
Canadian male television actors
Canadian male voice actors
Canadian male screenwriters
20th-century Canadian screenwriters
20th-century Canadian male writers